The 2023 Ivy League Men's Basketball Tournament, popularly referred to as "Ivy Madness", is the scheduled postseason men's basketball tournament for the Ivy League of the 2022–23 NCAA Division I men's basketball season. It was held on March 11 and 12, 2023, at the Jadwin Gymnasium on the campus of Princeton University in Princeton, New Jersey. The winner received the Ivy League's automatic bid to the 2023 NCAA Tournament.

Seeds 
The top four teams in the Ivy League regular-season standings qualify for the tournament and are seeded according to their records in conference play, resulting in a Shaughnessy playoff. If a tie for any of the top four positions exists, tiebreakers are applied in the following order:

 Head-to-head record between teams involved in the tie.
 Record against the top team(s) not involved in the tie in order of conference record, going down through the seedings until the tie is broken.
 Average of the teams' ranking in the following computer systems: NCAA NET, Sagarin, KenPom, and ESPN Basketball Percentage Index.

Schedule

Bracket

See also 
 2023 Ivy League women's basketball tournament

References 

Tournament
Ivy League men's basketball tournament
Sports in Princeton, New Jersey
College basketball tournaments in New Jersey
Ivy League men's basketball tournament
Ivy League men's basketball tournament